Taillon is a surname. Notable people with the surname include:

Daniel Taillon (born 1952), Canadian hurdler
Gilles Taillon (born 1945), Canadian politician
Jacinthe Taillon (born 1977), Canadian synchronized swimmer
Jameson Taillon (born 1991), American baseball player
Louis-Olivier Taillon (1840–1923), Canadian politician